Remer station in Remer, Minnesota, United States, is a depot built around 1910 by the Soo Line Railroad. It was listed on the National Register of Historic Places in 1980 as the Soo Line Depot.

Passenger train service to the Remer station ended on May 16, 1959, when trains 64 and 65 were discontinued between Duluth and Thief River Falls.

The depot now serves as a library, while the former rail right of way is a trail.

References

Buildings and structures in Cass County, Minnesota
Former Soo Line stations
Railway stations on the National Register of Historic Places in Minnesota
National Register of Historic Places in Cass County, Minnesota
Former railway stations in Minnesota
Transportation in Cass County, Minnesota
Railway stations closed in 1959